Genesys is an educational video game, released in 2000 for Windows-based PCs and Apple Macintoshes. It was developed by Cybele Productions and Wanadoo Edition.

The player is guided by Jeanne Moreau through Claude Richardet's game. The game allows the player to discover the key stages of the evolution of various human societies around the world.

External links 
 Genesys  at Microïds
 

History educational video games
Adventure games
2000 video games
Windows games
Microïds games
Classic Mac OS games
Video games developed in France